
 
UNDP Goodwill Ambassador is an official postnominal honorific title, title of authority, legal status and job description assigned to those goodwill ambassadors and advocates who are designated by the United Nations. The United Nations Development Programme (UNDP) along with other United Nations agencies, has long enlisted the voluntary services and support of prominent individuals as goodwill ambassadors to advocate these causes. Their fame helps amplify the urgent and universal message of human development and international cooperation, helping to accelerate achievement of the Millennium Development Goals. They articulate the UNDP development philosophy and programmes of self-reliant opportunities and motivate people to act in the interest of improving their own lives and those of their fellow citizens.

Current UNDP Goodwill Ambassadors
The following individuals serve as UNDP Goodwill Ambassadors and advocates:

 Antonio Banderas
 Bob Weir
 Cody Simpson
 Connie Britton
 Didier Drogba
 Crown Prince Haakon Magnus of Norway
 Iker Casillas
 Marta Vieira da Silva
 Misako Konno
 Michelle Yeoh
 Nikolaj Coster-Waldau
 Olafur Eliason
 Padma Lakshmi
 The Roca Brothers
 Match Against Poverty: Zinedine Zidane, Ronaldo
 Yemi Alade

See also
 Goodwill Ambassador
 FAO Goodwill Ambassador
 UNHCR Goodwill Ambassador
 UNESCO Goodwill Ambassador
 UNODC Goodwill Ambassador
 UNFPA Goodwill Ambassador
 UNIDO Goodwill Ambassador
 UNICEF Goodwill Ambassador
 UN Women Goodwill Ambassador
 WFP Goodwill Ambassador
 WHO Goodwill Ambassador

References

External links
UNDP Goodwill Ambassadors

United Nations Development Programme
Goodwill ambassador programmes
United Nations goodwill ambassadors